Walter Edward "Ed" Red  (born March 6, 1942) is an American athlete. He competed in the men's javelin throw at the 1964 Summer Olympics.  Known as Ed Red, he had one of the shortest names of any Olympian.

References

1942 births
Living people
Athletes (track and field) at the 1964 Summer Olympics
American male javelin throwers
Olympic track and field athletes of the United States
People from Kilgore, Texas
Track and field athletes from Texas